The Central Province ( Madhyama Paḷāta,  Madhdhiya Mākāṇam) is one of the nine provinces of Sri Lanka, the first level administrative division of the country. (The provinces have existed since the 19th century but did not have any legal status until 1987 when the 13th Amendment to the Constitution of Sri Lanka established provincial councils.) The Central Province is primarily in the central mountainous terrain of Sri Lanka. It is the 6th largest province by area and is home to 2.5 million people. It is bordered by North Central Province to the north, Uva Province to the east, North Western Province to the west and Sabaragamuwa Province to the south and west. The province's capital is Kandy.

The cities of Matale and Nuwara Eliya are in the Central Province. The province is famous for its production of Ceylon tea, planted by the British in the 1860s after a devastating disease killed all the coffee plantations in the province. The Central Province attracts many tourists, with hill station towns such as Gampola, Hatton and Nuwara Eliya.

History
Though three successive European powers invaded Sri Lanka during the 16th to the 19th century, the Central Province maintained its independence until the early 19th century when the British conquered Kandy. The British then established a colonial headman ranking system in 1824, which came into effect in 1832.

Colonial head mudaliyars
 Sir Christofel de-Silva (1824–1842) 
 Don William Gunawardene De-Saram III (1842–1856) 
 Sir Hendrick Ekanayake (1856–1860) 
 Sir Alexander-James Divakara Mohotti (1860–1888) 
 Don Agaris Divakara Mohotti (1888–1924)

The Mudaliyar Office was abolished in 1924 and the last of the colonial headman retired from their positions and gave up the rule to the British officers in 1926. All headman positions were then passed down to the newly elected governor-general of Central Province. This was established in 1929 as a way for the British to directly rule the provinces.

The historic Matale, Temple of the Tooth, Dambulla cave temple, Aluwihare temple and the Sigiriya rock are in the Central Province.

Geography
The province has an area of 5,674 km2 and a population of 2,421,148. Major towns include Kandy (119,186), Matale (39,869), Dambulla (75,290), Gampola (26,481), Nuwara Eliya (27,449) and Hatton (16,790).

Mountain ranges 
Knuckles Mountain Range, Adam's Peak and Horton Plains are UNESCO World Heritage Sites in the Central Province.

Climate
The climate is cool, and many areas above 1,500 metres often have chilly nights. The western slopes are very wet, some places have almost 7,000 mm of rain per year. The eastern slopes are parts of the mid-dry zone as it is receiving rain only from North-Eastern monsoon. The temperatures range from 24 °C at Kandy to just 16 °C in Nuwara Eliya, which is 1,889 m above sea level. The highest mountains in Sri Lanka are in the Central Province. The terrain is mostly mountainous, with deep valleys cutting into it. The two main mountain regions are the central massif and the Knuckles range to the east of Kandy.

Demographics
The population is a mixture of Sinhalese, Tamil and the Moors. Many tea plantation workers are Indian Tamils, brought over to Sri Lanka by the British in the 19th century.

Ethnicity

Religion
As per the 2012 Sri Lankan census, there were 16,72,625 Buddhists, 5,40,339 Hindus, 2,63,874 Muslims, 94,402 Christians and 317 people following other faiths in the Central Province.

Administrative divisions

Central Province is divided into three districts and 36 divisional secretariats.

Districts

Divisional secretariats

The districts of the Sri Lanka are divided into administrative sub-units known as divisional secretariats. They were formerly known as 'D.R.O. Divisions' after the 'Divisional Revenue Officer'. Later the D.R.O.s became 'Assistant Government Agents' and the Divisions were known as 'A.G.A. Divisions'. Currently, the divisions are administered by a 'Divisional Secretary' and are known as a 'D.S. Divisions'.

There are 36 divisional secretariats in Central Province, which are listed below, by district. There are 20 in Kandy District, 11 in Matale District and 5 in Nuwara Eliya District.

Major population centres

See also
 List of settlements in Central Province (Sri Lanka)
 Provinces of Sri Lanka
 Districts of Sri Lanka
 Tea production in Sri Lanka

References

Maps
Searchable Map of Sri Lanka

External links

 Central Provincial Council Sri Lanka 
 Office of the Council Secretary – Central Provincial Council Sri Lanka 
 Chief Secretary's Office – Central Provincial Council Sri Lanka 
 Central Provincial Postal Codes Sri Lanka 
 Cities in Central province 

 
Provinces of Sri Lanka
Kingdom of Kandy